Frederick Charles Bartholomew (3 January 1885 – 1979) was an English professional footballer who made over 160 appearances in the Southern and Football Leagues for Reading. He served as a player, coach and groundsman for 53 years and is a member of the club's Hall of Fame. A utility player, his primary positions were centre half or full back.

Personal life 
Bartholomew served as a colour sergeant with the Middlesex Regiment's 1st Football Battalion during the First World War. After retiring from football in 1923, he spent three years on the coaching staff at Reading and then became groundsman at Elm Park until his retirement in 1957.

Honours 
Reading
Southern League Second Division: 1910–11

Individual

Reading Hall of Fame

References

English footballers
English Football League players
Association football utility players
Reading F.C. players
Reading F.C. non-playing staff
1885 births
sportspeople from Reading, Berkshire
1979 deaths
British Army personnel of World War I
Middlesex Regiment soldiers
Groundskeepers
Southern Football League players
Association football wing halves
Association football fullbacks
Military personnel from Reading, Berkshire